Denmark competed at the 1992 Winter Paralympics in Tignes/Albertville, France. 5 competitors from Denmark won a single silver medal and finished 18th in the medal table.

See also 
 Denmark at the Paralympics
 Denmark at the 1992 Winter Olympics

References 

Denmark at the Paralympics
1992 in Danish sport
Nations at the 1992 Winter Paralympics